Borak Tower (Bengali: বোরাক) is a commercial skyscraper complex in Dhaka, Bangladesh that is one of the tallest completed buildings in the country. The tower is located at Pantha Path in Dhaka. Construction was completed and the towers were inaugurated in 2013.

References

Buildings and structures in Dhaka
Skyscraper office buildings in Bangladesh
Office buildings completed in 2013
Commercial buildings completed in 2013
2013 establishments in Bangladesh